Fud or FUD may refer to

People 
 "Fud" John Benson (artisan) (born 1939), American artist
 Fud Candrix (1908–1974), Belgian jazz saxophonist and violinist
 Fud Leclerc (1924–2010), Belgian singer
 Fud Livingston (1906–1957), American jazz musician

Other uses 
 FUD (fear, uncertainty and doubt), a propaganda tactic
 Fud (brand) of Sigma Alimentos foods
 Federal University Dutse, Nigeria
 fud, the ISO 639-3 code for the Futunan language
 Suifenhe Airport, Heilongjiang, China, IATA code
 Fud Bay Village, Fanshan City, Cangnan County, Zhejiang Province, China

See also 

 Formerly Used Defense Sites (FUDS) of the U.S. military
 
 
 Fudd (disambiguation)